The Hellenic Gendarmerie (Elliniki Chorofylaki) was the national gendarmerie and military police (until 1951) force of Greece.

History

19th century

The Greek Gendarmerie was established after the enthronement of King Otto in 1833 as the Royal Gendarmerie and modeled after the French National Gendarmerie. It was at that time formally part of the army and under the authority of the Army Ministry. Several foreign advisers (particularly from Bavaria, who emphasized elements of centralization and authoritarianism), were also brought in to provide training and tactical advice to the newly formed force. The main task of the Gendarmerie under the army as a whole during this period was firstly to combat the extensive banditry which was endemic in the countryside throughout the 19th century and included kidnappings for ransom, the suppression of local revolts, and the establishment of a strong executive government.  Dimitrios Deligeorgis was appointed commander in 1854.

The army's links to the Gendarmerie and the nature of the structure of the force and its hierarchy (that of being similar to the army) was maintained throughout the 19th century for a number of reasons, primarily the socio-political unrest that characterized the period including disproportionate poverty, governmental oppression, sporadic rebellions and political instability. As a result of this, as well as the input of the armed forces, the Gendarmerie remained a largely conservative body throughout the period, there was also a certain amount of politicization during training as the Gendarmerie were trained in military camps.

20th century

In 1906 the Gendarmerie underwent its first major restructuring at an administrative level. It acquired its own educational and training facilities independent of those of the army (though still remaining a nominal part of the armed forces). Despite this the Gendarmerie still maintained a largely military based structure, based on its involvement in the Macedonian Struggle, and the Balkan and First World Wars. As a result, it tended to neglect civilian matters, something addressed with the establishment of a civilian city police force for Attica in 1920, which would eventually be expanded to urban centers in the entire country.

Modernization of the country's police forces was stunted by the successive periods of political instability, which culminated in the regime of Ioannis Metaxas and the Second World War. After the war however, British experts were brought in to help reform the police along the lines of the British Police. As a result, after 1946 the police forces ceased to be a formal part of the Defence Ministry, although they retained several military features and were organized along military lines.

Reflecting a new emphasis on civilian policing, in 1984 both the Gendarmerie and the city police were merged into a single unified Hellenic Police which however maintained elements of the former military structure and hierarchy.

Ranks Insignia

1908–1935 
{| border="1" cellpadding="1" cellspacing="0" width="60%"
!colspan=6| Ranks
|- align="center" - bgcolor="#CCCCCC"
|Moirarchos 
|Ypomoirarchos 
|Anthypomoirarchos
|Enomotarchis A'''
|Enomotarchis Β'|Ypenomotarchis|- align="center" width="10%"
| 
| 
| 
| 
| 
| 
|}

 1935–1970 

 1975–1984 

 Equipment 

 Small arms 

References

Notes
 After the War was Over,'' Mark Mazower (Reconstructing the family, nation and state in Greece).
^ Law 1481/1 October 1984, Official Journal of the Hellenic Republic, A-152

External links
Greek Police official site

 
Military units and formations established in 1833
1833 establishments in Greece
1984 disestablishments in Greece